The 2002 CONCACAF Women's Gold Cup was the sixth staging of the CONCACAF Women's Gold Cup. It was held in Seattle, Washington, United States and Vancouver, British Columbia, Canada. The winning team, the United States, and runners-up, Canada, qualified for the 2003 FIFA Women's World Cup. The U.S. were later awarded hosting rights to the 2003 tournament, replacing China due to the SARS outbreak. The third-placed Mexico played against Japan in two play-off matches for qualification.

UNCAF Qualifying
Nicaragua and Belize withdrew. The first-placed Costa Rica and the second-placed Panama qualified for the Women's Gold Cup.

CFU Qualifying

First round

Group 1

First leg

Second leg

Group 2

Group 3

Final round

Semifinals

Third Place Playoff

Final tournament

First round

Group A

Group B

Knockout stage

Semi-finals
Winners qualified for 2003 FIFA Women's World Cup.

Third place playoff
Winner advanced to CONCACAF–AFC play-off.

Final

Awards

 Most Valuable Player (as Selected by Media):  Tiffeny Milbrett (USA) 
 Golden Boot:  Christine Sinclair;  Tiffeny Milbrett;  Charmaine Hooper (7 Goals) 
 Top Goalkeeper (as Selected by Women's Gold Cup Technical Study Group):  Jennifer Molina 
 Fair Play Trophy: Costa Rica

Best XI

Goalkeeper
  Jennifer Molina (MEX) 
Defenders
 Candace Chapman (CAN)
 Joy Fawcett (USA)
 Brandi Chastain (USA) 
 Monica Gonzalez (MEX) 
Midfielders
 Shirley Cruz (CRC)
 Aly Wagner (USA)
 Christine Sinclair (CAN) 
Forwards
 Shannon MacMillan (USA)
 Tiffeny Milbrett (USA)
 Charmaine Hooper (USA)

Substitutes
GK:  Lisa Jo Ramkissoon (TRI)
DF:  Gabriela Trujillo (CRC)
MD:  Tasha St. Louis (TRI)
AT:  Marie-Denise Gilles (HAI)
AT:  Maribel Domínguez (MEX)
AT:  Kara Lang (CAN)
A:T  Cindy Parlow (USA)

References

External links
Tables & Results at RSSSF.com
Regulations

 Women's Gold Cup
CONCACAF Women's Championship tournaments
2003 FIFA Women's World Cup qualification
International women's association football competitions hosted by Canada
International women's association football competitions hosted by the United States
Soccer in British Columbia
Soccer in Washington (state)
CON
2002 in Canadian soccer
2002 in American women's soccer
CONCACAF Women's Gold Cup
2002 in British Columbia
November 2002 sports events in North America
2002 in sports in California